Robbing Mussolini is a 2022 Italian historical comedy-drama film directed by Renato De Maria.

Cast

Reception 
In his review for Cineuropa, Davide Abbatescianni defined the film as "another missed opportunity." He highlighted how "the acting performances, which are all sadly below par, are heavily constricted by weak writing when it comes to character construction, and superficial when exploring conflict," adding that "the film’s narrative subplots are disappointingly predictable."

See also 
 List of Italian films of 2022

References

External links

2020s Italian-language films
2022 comedy-drama films
Italian heist films
Italian comedy-drama films
Italian-language Netflix original films
Films scored by David Holmes (musician)
Films set in 1945
2020s Italian films